Henri Nayrou (born 21 November 1944 in Suc-et-Sentenac, Ariège) is a French journalist and politician who has been president of the departmental council of Ariège since November 2014. A member of the French Socialist Party, he represented the 2nd constituency of Ariège in the National Assembly from 1997 to 2012.

References

1944 births
Deputies of the 11th National Assembly of the French Fifth Republic
Deputies of the 12th National Assembly of the French Fifth Republic
Deputies of the 13th National Assembly of the French Fifth Republic
Living people
Socialist Party (France) politicians